Pierre Henri Larthomas (4 June 1915 in Sainte-Foy-la-Grande – 8 July 2000) was a French theatre theorist.   Larthomas entered the French Army in 1930 as a cadet officer and in the Spring of 1940 was awarded the Croix de Guerre.  Shortly thereafter he was taken prisoner and spent the next five years in German P.O.W. camps. It was during that period that he began to write.  After WWII he was a schoolmaster at Lycees in Bordeaux and Paris.

Works 
1948:  Rencontre: roman , Paris, Rene Julliard, 1948
1951:  Solitaire, Boston, Houghton Mifflin.
1965: Le Supplément du Dictionnaire critique de Féraud, Le Français Moderne, 33: 241-55
 Le Langage dramatique, Paris, Presses Universitaires de France, 1972, 1997 et 2012, 
1966: Eugénie, collection Espace théâtre, Espaces 34, 
1997: La Technique du théâtre, Que sais-je ?, Presses universitaires de France, 
1998: Notions de stylistique générale, Linguistique nouvelle, Presses universitaires de France, 
1999: Le Mariage de Figaro, Folio, European Schoolbooks,

References

External links 
 Pierre Lathomas on Babelio
  Pierre Larthomas (1915-2000) on Persée
 Le Langage dramatique sur PUF

French theatre critics
Theatre theorists
People from Gironde
1915 births
2000 deaths
Recipients of the Croix de Guerre 1939–1945 (France)
French prisoners of war in World War II